Emanuel Gottlieb Leutze (May 24, 1816July 18, 1868) was a German-American history painter best known for his 1851 painting Washington Crossing the Delaware. He is associated with the Düsseldorf school of painting.

Biography
Leutze was born in Schwäbisch Gmünd, Württemberg, Germany. Later he was brought to the United States as a child in 1825. His parents settled first in Fredericksburg, Virginia, and then at Philadelphia. The first development of his artistic talent occurred while he was attending the sickbed of his father, when he attempted drawing to occupy the long hours of waiting. His father died in 1831. At 14, he was painting portraits for $5 apiece. Through such work, he supported himself after the death of his father. In 1834, he received his first instruction in art at the classes of John Rubens Smith, a portrait painter in Philadelphia. He soon became skilled, and promoted a plan for publishing, in Washington, portraits of eminent American statesmen; however, he was met with slight encouragement.

Europe
In 1840, one of his paintings attracted attention and gave him several orders, which enabled him to attend the Kunstakademie Düsseldorf in his native Germany. Due to his anti-academic attitude, he studied only one year at the academy, in the class of Director Schadow. Leutze was mostly influenced by the painter Karl Friedrich Lessing. In 1842 he went to Munich, studying the works of Cornelius and Kaulbach, and, while there, finished his Columbus before the Queen. The following year he visited Venice and Rome, making studies from Titian and Michelangelo. His first work, Columbus before the Council of Salamanca (1841) was purchased by the Düsseldorf Art Union. A companion picture, Columbus in Chains, procured him the gold medal of the Brussels Art Exhibition, and was subsequently purchased by the Art Union in New York; it was the basis of the 1893 $2 Columbian Issue stamp. In 1845, after a tour in Italy, he returned to Düsseldorf, marrying Juliane Lottner and making his home there for 14 years.

During his years in Düsseldorf, he was a resource for visiting Americans: he found them places to live and work, provided introductions, and gave them emotional and even financial support. For many years, he was the president of the Düsseldorf Artists' Association; in 1848, he was an early promoter of the "Malkasten" art association; and in 1857, he led the call for a gathering of artists which originated the founding of the Allgemeine deutsche Kunstgenossenschaft.
A strong supporter of Europe's Revolutions of 1848, Leutze decided to paint an image that would encourage Europe's liberal reformers with the example of the American Revolution. Using American tourists and art students as models and assistants, Leutze finished a first version of Washington Crossing the Delaware in 1850.  Just after it was completed, the first version was damaged by fire in his studio, subsequently restored, and acquired by the Kunsthalle Bremen. On September 5, 1942, during World War II, it was destroyed in a bombing raid by the Allied forces. The second painting, a replica of the first, only larger, was ordered in 1850 by the Parisian art trader Adolphe Goupil for his New York branch and placed on exhibition on Broadway in October 1851. It is now owned by the Metropolitan Museum of Art in New York. In 1854, Leutze finished his depiction of the Battle of Monmouth, "Washington rallying the troops at Monmouth," commissioned by an important patron, the banker David Leavitt of New York City and Great Barrington, Massachusetts.

New York City and Washington, D.C.
In 1859, Leutze returned to the United States and opened a studio in New York City. He divided his time between New York City and Washington, D.C. In 1859, he painted a portrait of Chief Justice Roger Brooke Taney, which hangs in the Harvard Law School. In a 1992 opinion, Justice Antonin Scalia described the portrait of Taney, made two years after Taney's infamous decision in Dred Scott v. Sandford, as showing Taney "in black, sitting in a shadowed red armchair, left hand resting upon a pad of paper in his lap, right hand hanging limply, almost lifelessly, beside the inner arm of the chair. He sits facing the viewer and staring straight out. There seems to be on his face, and in his deep-set eyes, an expression of profound sadness and disillusionment."

Leutze also executed other portraits, including one of fellow painter William Morris Hunt. That portrait was owned by Hunt's brother Leavitt Hunt, a New York attorney and sometime Vermont resident, and was shown at an exhibition devoted to William Morris Hunt's work at the Museum of Fine Arts, Boston in 1878.

In 1860 Leutze was commissioned by the U.S. Congress to decorate a stairway in the Capitol Building in Washington, DC, for which he painted a large composition, Westward the Course of Empire Takes Its Way, which is also commonly known as Westward Ho!.

Late in life, he became a member of the National Academy of Design. He was also a member of the Union League Club of New York, which has a number of his paintings. At age 52, he died in Washington, D.C. of heat stroke. He was interred at Glenwood Cemetery. At the time of his death, a painting, The Emancipation of the Slaves, was in preparation.Leutze's portraits are known for their artistic quality and their patriotic romanticism. Washington Crossing the Delaware firmly ranks among the American national iconography.

Reception
Republican politician Kevin McCarthy, after being elected to become speaker of the U.S. House of Representatives in January 2023, cited Leutze's painting in his remarks, mispronouncing his name as "Linz". During his speech, McCarthy used Leutze as an exemplary German immigrant striving for freedom who created his paintings to start a "revolution" in his home country. In March 2022, for a video posted on his facebook page, he posed in front of the painting, which is actually by Steve Penley, not Leutze, and shows an American Flag partially "superimposed" on the Leutzian motive's background.

Gallery of works

Footnotes

References

Additional References:
 Wierich, Jochen. Grand Themes: Emanuel Leutze, "Washington Crossing the Delaware," and American History Painting (Penn State University Press; 2012) 240 pages; Argues that the painting was a touchstone for debates over history painting at a time of intense sectionalism.

 Irre, Heidrun. Emanuel Gottlob Leutze: Von der Rems zum Delaware, einhorn-Verlag+Druck GmbH, Schwäbisch Gmünd 2016,  https://einhornverlag.de/shop/buecher/von-der-rems-zum-delaware/ 
 New International Encyclopedia

External links

 Leutze Gallery at MuseumSyndicate
 Emanuel Leutze
 
 Introduction to Washington's Crossing by David Hackett Fischer at the Oxford University Press blog, discusses Leutze's most famous painting.
 
 
 Reynolda House Museum of American Art
Art and the empire city: New York, 1825-1861, an exhibition catalog from The Metropolitan Museum of Art (fully available online as PDF), which contains material on Leutze (see index)
 

1816 births
1868 deaths
People from Schwäbisch Gmünd
19th-century American painters
American male painters
19th-century German painters
19th-century American male artists
German male painters
People of the Revolutions of 1848
German emigrants to the United States
Burials at Glenwood Cemetery (Washington, D.C.)
19th-century painters of historical subjects
National Academy of Design members
American history painters
Artists of the Boston Public Library
Düsseldorf school of painting